Lassaad Maamar (born 10 April 1968 in Tunis) is a Tunisian football manager

References

Living people
Tunisian football managers
ES Zarzis managers
AS Djerba managers
JS Kairouan managers
Stade Gabèsien managers
AS Gabès managers
EO Sidi Bouzid managers
Al-Ahly Shendi managers
CO Médenine managers
DRB Tadjenanet managers
Al-Fayha FC managers
Tunisian expatriate football managers
Expatriate football managers in Libya
Tunisian expatriate sportspeople in Libya
Expatriate football managers in Saudi Arabia
Tunisian expatriate sportspeople in Saudi Arabia
Expatriate football managers in Sudan
Tunisian expatriate sportspeople in Sudan
Expatriate football managers in Algeria
Tunisian expatriate sportspeople in Algeria
1968 births